Headhunter Redemption is an action-adventure video game developed by Amuze and published by Sega for PlayStation 2 and Xbox. It is the sequel to Headhunter.

Plot

Set twenty years after the Bloody Mary Virus (released in the original Headhunter), Jack and his new partner Leeza X find out something is amiss when they try to stop Weapon Smugglers. The pair must face opposition from the Glass Skyscrapers filled and media controlled 'Above' and The Dregs & Criminal Infested colonies of 'Below'. Jack and Leeza must also face their fears as they try to redeem a world from chaos, especially Jack, whose son was taken away by forces from 'Below', but might still be alive.

Reception

Headhunter Redemption received "mixed or average" reviews, according to video game review aggregator Metacritic.

References

External links

2004 video games
Action-adventure games
Lua (programming language)-scripted video games
PlayStation 2 games
RenderWare games
Science fiction video games
Sega video games
Video game sequels
Video games about police officers
Video games scored by Richard Jacques
Video games developed in Sweden
Video games featuring female protagonists
Xbox games